Waterville USA, or simply known as Waterville, is a  water and amusement park located a quarter-mile from the Gulf of Mexico in the city of Gulf Shores, Alabama, on Gulf Shores Parkway (Alabama State Route 59). The park opened in 1986, and since then has added numerous water and amusement attractions.

Water park 
The water park is the original section of the park. All of the original slides and attractions have been removed or replaced, except for the wave pool and lazy river attractions.

Amusement park

Former rides and attractions 
Over the years, Waterville has had to remove and replace attractions due to hurricane damage and the passing of time. In September 2004, the eye of Hurricane Ivan passed directly over Gulf Shores and the surrounding areas. Due to the park's close proximity to the coastline, Waterville was severely flooded by storm surges, and experienced damaging winds that severely damaged two of the water park's attractions. Repairs went on during 2005 and 2006, and the park fully reopened in 2007 with replacement attractions. In 2013, two slides were removed to make room for a new slide.

External links 
 Waterville USA at Ultimate Waterpark
 Waterville USA Official Website
 

Buildings and structures in Baldwin County, Alabama
Water parks in Alabama
Amusement parks in Alabama
1986 establishments in Alabama